Gerald Hiken (May 27, 1927 – January 6, 2021) was an American actor.

Career
A native of Milwaukee, he studied acting at HB Studio in New York City. Hiken was nominated for the Tony Award for Best Actor in a Play in 1980 for his performance in Strider. He has performed in many other Broadway plays and has appeared in supporting and bit roles in various films including The Candidate (1972), Reds (1981), and Fat Man and Little Boy (1989).

On television, Gerald Hiken was a frequent guest star on Car 54, Where Are You?, a show created by his cousin Nat Hiken. In 1988, Gerald Hiken appeared in two consecutive Cheers episodes. He played the character Dennis, father of executive Martin Teale in season 7, episodes 3 and 4: "Executive Sweet" and "One Happy Chappy in a Snappy Serape".

Hiken died on January 6, 2021, at the age of 93.

Partial filmography

Awards and nominations
Hiken was nominated for the Tony Award for Best Actor in a Play in 1980 for his performance in Strider.

References

External links
 
 
 

1927 births
2021 deaths
20th-century American male actors
American male film actors
Place of death missing
Jewish American male actors
Male actors from Milwaukee
American male stage actors